The Pacific Northwest Athletic Conference was an NAIA conference that operated from 1984 to 1998. Formed by the remnants of the Evergreen Conference, the conference broke up when most of its remaining members joined the NCAA's Pacific West Conference.

Members
The following is an incomplete list of the membership of the Pacific Northwest Athletic Conference.

References

Defunct college sports conferences in the United States
Sport in British Columbia
College sports in Idaho
College sports in Alaska
College sports in Washington (state)
1984 establishments in the United States
1998 disestablishments in the United States